The Transvaal Government Gazette (Transvaalsche Gouvernements Courant) was the government gazette of Transvaal Colony between 1877, when Britain annexed the Zuid Afrikaanse Republiek (South African Republic) (ZAR), and the end of the First Boer War in 1881.

See also
List of British colonial gazettes
Province of the Transvaal Official Gazette (from 1910)

References

British colonial gazettes
Publications established in 1877
Former provinces of South Africa
1877 establishments in the South African Republic